Paul Guilfoyle (July 14, 1902 – June 27, 1961) was an American stage, film and television actor. Later in his career, he also directed films and television episodes.

Guilfoyle was born in Jersey City, New Jersey.

He started off working on stage, performing on Broadway in 16 plays according to the Internet Broadway Database, beginning with The Jolly Roger and Cyrano de Bergerac in 1923 and ending with Jayhawker in 1934. He appeared in many films that starred Lee Tracy in the 1930s. In the 1949 crime film White Heat, he played (uncredited) a treacherous prison inmate murdered in cold blood by James Cagney's lead character.

He died of a heart attack on June 27, 1961 in Hollywood. He had a son, Anthony. Guilfoyle was interred in Glendale, California's Forest Lawn Memorial Park Cemetery.

Filmography

Television credits

References

External links

1902 births
1961 deaths
20th-century American male actors
20th-century American singers
American film directors
American male film actors
American male stage actors
American male television actors
American television directors
Burials at Forest Lawn Memorial Park (Glendale)
Male actors from Jersey City, New Jersey